The 1973 Australian Grand Prix was a race for Australian Formula 1 and Australian Formula 2 racing cars, the former class incorporating Formula 5000 cars. It was held on 4 November at Sandown and was the second AGP in a row to be held at that circuit.

It was the thirty eighth Australian Grand Prix and doubled as round four of the 1973 Australian Drivers' Championship.  Defending winner Graham McRae won his second AGP ahead of John McCormack and Johnnie Walker.

Classification 

Results as follows:

Qualifying

Race

Notes 
Pole position: John McCormack – 1'01.2
Fastest lap: Graham McRae – 1'01.6

References

External links
 Image, Graham McRae, McRae GM2, 1973 Australian Grand Prix, autopics.com.au

Grand Prix
Australian Grand Prix
Motorsport at Sandown
Formula 5000 race reports
Australian Grand Prix